Kelak-e Sofla (also Romanized as Kelāk-e Soflá; also known as Kelāk-e Pā’īn) is a village in Owzrud Rural District, Baladeh District, Nur County, Mazandaran Province, Iran. At the 2006 census, its population was 67, in 36 families.

References 

Populated places in Nur County